Juan Barro (born 21 November 1956) is a Spanish former freestyle swimmer who competed in the 1980 Summer Olympics.

References

1956 births
Living people
Spanish male freestyle swimmers
Olympic swimmers of Spain
Swimmers at the 1980 Summer Olympics